Sukhana Dam, is an earthfill dam on Sukhana river near Aurangabad in village Garkheda in the state of Maharashtra in India.

Specifications

See also
 Dams in Maharashtra
 List of reservoirs and dams in India

References

Dams in Aurangabad district, Maharashtra
Dams completed in 1968
1968 establishments in Maharashtra